Hadria may refer to:
Hadria, an alternative spelling for the Etruscan city that is now Adria in the Veneto region of Northern Italy.
Hadria, an alternative spelling for the city that is now Atri in the Abruzzo region of Central Italy.
Hadria, a prominent Croatian company in the real estate market 
Hadria, a prominent Croatian company in possession of Camp Straško****, Hotel Loža** and Hotel Liburnija**